Majorera Assembly (AM) is a party in Fuerteventura. It was founded in 1977 as a group of independents by Miguel Cabrera Cabrera, who was elected senator in the 1977 and 1982 general elections.

Before the autonomy of the Canary Islands, AM had a seat in the Canarian Junta. In the 1983 regional election, it gained 3 out of 7 deputies in Fuerteventura. When the party Canarian Independent Groups was formed in 1985, AM refused to join, repeating its result in solitary in the 1987 regional election.

In 1995, it joined Canarian Coalition.

References

Political parties in the Canary Islands
1977 establishments in Spain